Sathyam is a 2004 Indian Malayalam-language action thriller film written and directed by Vinayan, starring Prithviraj Sukumaran and Priyamani. It was Priyamani's debut film in Malayalam.

Plot 
The story circles around Sanjeev Kumar (Prithviraj Sukumaran) who is awaiting his selection into the police force. But it was being delayed by the then Police commissioner Mambilly Mukundan Menon (Anandaraj), who is backed up by his political and underground relationships and has a grudge against Sanjeev's father Ayyappan Nair (Thilakan). When things go beyond a limit, Sanjeev gets fed up, and locks up Mukundan in a secret location. Sanjeev gets selected for the police force and joins as a Sub-Inspector near his home town, and gets a lot of praise for his work in curbing crime in the city.

In the meanwhile, Mukundan manages to escape the secret location. Sanjeev manages to prove that Mukundan is insane and puts him in an asylum. But he faces many obstacles. His wife Sona (Priyamani) and he gets shot by his men and his younger brother Prakash (Suresh Krishna) during a fight when they when they were kidnapping Sona. Sanjeev kills Prakash and saves Sona. His niece Chinnukutty (Taruni Sachdev) and Ayyappan gets kidnapped by Mukundan and his men and Mukundan kills Ayyappan Nair (Thilakan). Sanjeev fights with Mukundan and his men. Sanjeev kills Mukundan and saves Chinnukutty.

Cast 
 Prithviraj Sukumaran as Sanjeev Kumar
 Priyamani as Sona
 Taruni Sachdev as Chinnukutty, Sanjeev's Niece 
 Thilakan as Ayyappan Nair
 Anandaraj as Mambilly Mukundan Menon. Eldest among Mambilly brothers
 Rajeev as Minister Mambilly Madhavan Menon
 Suresh Krishna as Mambilly Prakash Menon
 Lalu Alex as Police Officer James
 Captain Raju as Commissioner Karthikeyan
 Venu Nagavalli as Chief Minister Mohandas
 Kochu Preman as Arjun, Policeman
 Baburaj as Mattancherry Martin
 Kollam Thulasi as Chellappan, Police Officer
 Bindu Ramakrishnan as Sanjeev's mother
 Babu Swamy as Mahendran, Sona’ Father

Soundtrack 
The film's soundtrack contains six songs, all composed by M. Jayachandran. Lyrics were by S. Ramesan Nair and Kaithapram Damodaran Namboothiri.

References

External links

2004 films
2000s Malayalam-language films
Films directed by Vinayan
Films scored by M. Jayachandran